The men's decathlon event at the 2022 African Championships in Athletics was held on 10 and 11 August in Port Louis, Mauritius.

Medalists

Results

100 metres
Wind: +3.7 m/s

Long jump

Shot put

High jump

400 metres

110 metres hurdles
Wind: +2.9 m/s

Discus throw

Pole vault

Javelin throw

1500 metres

Final standings

References

2022 African Championships in Athletics
Combined events at the African Championships in Athletics